The 2021 Stockport Metropolitan Borough Council election were held on 6 May 2021, to elect members of Stockport Metropolitan Borough Council in England. This was on the same day as other local elections.

Stockport Council is elected in thirds, which means that in each three member local ward, one councillor is elected every year, except every four years which is classed as a fallow year.  These elections were originally scheduled for 2020 but were suspended for a year due to the COVID-19 pandemic. Due to the delayed election those councillors elected in 2021 will serve a three-year term, expiring in 2024.

Result summary 
Changes in seat numbers are compared with the composition of the council immediately prior to the election. Changes in vote share are compared with the previous election in 2019.

Aftermath 

Since 2011, no single political party has held a majority on the council, with it being run as a minority administration by the largest party - from 2011 to 2016 by the Liberal Democrats, and since 2016 by Labour. In this election, the Liberal Democrats overtook Labour to once again become the largest party on the council. In the subsequent council vote however, the eight-strong Conservative group decided to support the continuation of the minority Labour administration, voting against a bid to remove the Labour leader of the council.

Election results by ward  
Asterisk indicates incumbent in the Ward, and Bold names highlight winning candidate.

All % changes are since 2016, when these seats were last up for election.

Bramhall North

Bramhall South and Woodford

Bredbury and Woodley

Bredbury Green and Romiley

Brinnington and Central

Cheadle and Gatley

Cheadle Hulme North

Cheadle Hulme South

Davenport and Cale Green

Edgeley & Cheadle Heath

Hazel Grove

Heald Green

Heatons North

Heatons South

Manor

Marple North

Marple South and High Lane

Offerton

Reddish North

Reddish South

Stepping Hill

References 

Stockport Metropolitan Borough Council elections
Stockport
May 2021 events in the United Kingdom
2020s in Greater Manchester